Gnorimoschema klotsi is a moth in the family Gelechiidae. It was described by Povolný in 1967. It is found widespread throughout North America, where it has been recorded from Nevada and California.

References

Gnorimoschema
Moths described in 1967